The following outline is provided as an overview of and topical guide to dentistry and oral health:

Dentistry – branch of medicine that is involved in the study, diagnosis, prevention, and treatment of diseases, disorders and conditions of the oral cavity, maxillofacial area and the adjacent and associated structures and their impact on the human body.

Branches of dentistry

 Endodontics
 Orthodontics
 Minimal intervention dentistry
 Prosthodontics
 Pediatric dentistry
 Periodontics
 Oral and maxillofacial surgery
 Oral pathology
 Oral medicine
 public health dentistry

History of dentistry

 History of dental caries

General dentistry concepts
Barodontalgia
Biodontics
Bruxism
Calculus
Ceramics
Crown
Dental amalgam
Dental brace
Dental cavities
Dental disease
Dental extraction
Dental notation
Dental phobia
Dental restoration
Dental spa
Dentin
Floss
Fluoridation
Fluoride therapy
Gingivitis
Halitosis
Dental implants
Laboratory technology
Mouth breathing
Mouthwash
Nitrous oxide
Novocain, a Local anesthetic
Occlusion
Oral hygiene
Orthodontics
Regenerative endodontics
Patron Saint of dentistry (Saint Apollonia)
Periodontitis
Plaque
Socket preservation
Regenerative dentistry
Teledentistry
Temporomandibular joint disease
Tooth
Toothbrush
Toothpaste
Tooth regeneration
Tongue cleaner
Xerostomia

Dentistry lists

 List of dentists

References

Dentistry
Dentistry